Košarkaški klub Vojvodina Srbijagas, commonly referred to as KK Vojvodina Srbijagas, was a men's professional basketball club based in Novi Sad, Serbia. The club participated in the Basketball League of Serbia and Adriatic League. They played their home games in SPC Vojvodina. 

The club was also known as Nova Vojvodina to distinguish it from the same-name town rivals KK Vojvodina. The club disbanded before the 2016–17 season due to a bad financial situation, when the sponsor, Srbijagas, ceased their investments in the team. It was not a member of the Vojvodina Sport Society, but a successor of the KK Beobanka and KK Novi Sad clubs.

History

KK Beobanka period 

KK Beobanka was a club based in Belgrade, FR Yugoslavia (now Serbia). The club competed in the First League of FR Yugoslavia from 1995 to 2000. Their matches were played at the Palata sportova. Their biggest success was the participation in the 1997–98 Federal Republic of Yugoslavia Cup final where they lost to the Budućnost. They participated in European competitions – the FIBA Korać Cup (1996–97, and 1998–99) and the FIBA EuroCup (1997–98).  It was coached by Darko Ruso. The club was legally disbanded in summer of 2000, relocated to Novi Sad, and renamed to KK NIS Vojvodina.

Relocation to Novi Sad: Vojvodina period 

KK NIS Vojvodina
Shortly afterward, the Petroleum Industry of Serbia (NIS) took over the founding rights and became the owner of the entire capital of Beobanka/Vojvodina Srbijagas.  Thus was created KK NIS Vojvodina before the start of the 2000–01 season.  In their debut season in the YUBA League, they finished in eighth place during the regular season, and qualified for the playoffs, where they were eliminated in the first round by KK Budućnost Podgorica after two games.

KK Vojvodina Srbijagas
In 2006, the club changed its name back to the simpler KK Vojvodina Srbijagas. In 2011, the club was merged with another local team, KK Novi Sad. The merger was done to help strengthen the financial position of the clubs. In the summer of 2016, however, Vojvodina Srbijagas went into bankruptcy and subsequently it was dissolved.

Arena

Sports Center Vojvodina is a multi-purpose indoor arena located in Novi Sad and it has a capacity of 11,500 seats.

 New Belgrade Sports Hall, Belgrade (1995–2000)
 SPC Vojvodina, Novi Sad (2000–2016)

Head coaches 

Beobanka
  Zoran Slavnić (1993–1994)
  Darko Ruso (1994–2000)
Vojvodina
  Srđan Antić (2000)
  Milovan Stepandić (2000–2002)
  Miodrag Baletić (2002)
  Miroslav Nikolić (2002–2003)
  Nikola Lazić (2003–2004)
  Jovica Arsić (2004–2005)
  Vlade Đurović (2005)
  Velimir Gašić (2006–2007)
  Zoran Sretenović (2008)
  Milan Minić (2008–2009)
  Vlade Đurović (2009)
  Siniša Matić (2011–2013)
  Dušan Alimpijević (2013–2015)
  Dejan Parežanin (2015–2016)

Season by season

Notable players

KK Beobanka players

  Petar Božić
  Zoran Stevanović
  Luka Pavićević
  Mlađan Šilobad
  Aleksandar Glintić
   Vladimir Kuzmanović
  Goran Ćakić
  Oliver Popović
  Vojkan Benčić
  Marko Ivanović
  Stevan Nađfeji
  Milan Preković

KK Vojvodina players

  Milan Gurović
  Nikola Kalinić
  Milenko Tepić
  Ivan Paunić
  Zlatko Bolić
  Nenad Čanak
  Miljan Pavković
  Vanja Plisnić
  Jovo Stanojević
  Predrag Šuput
  Milan Dozet
  Aleksandar Čubrilo
  Dušan Đorđević
  Đorđe Gagić
  Mile Ilić
  Strahinja Milošević
  Čedomir Vitkovac
  Stefan Pot 
  Dragoljub Vidačić
  Filip Čović
  Stefan Stojačić
  Dejan Borovnjak
  Nemanja Nenadić
  Uroš Mirković
  Radovan Marković
  Milan Milovanović
  Jovan Novak 
  Miljan Pupović 
  Miloš Borisov
  Dejan Radonjić
  Vladimir Golubović
   Dragan Zeković
  István Németh
  Ivan Opačak 
  Feliks Kojadinović 
  Siniša Kovačević
  Marko Šutalo
  Smiljan Pavič
  Kebu Stewart
  Charron Fisher
  Reggie Freeman
  Vonteego Cummings 
  Hassan Adams
  Paul Grant

International record

References

External links

 KK Beobanka on the FIBA Europe site
 KK Vojvodina Srbijagas at eurobasket.com
 KK Vojvodina Srbijagas at srbijasport.net

Defunct basketball teams in Serbia
Basketball teams in Belgrade
Sport in Novi Sad
Basketball teams disestablished in 2016
1995 establishments in Serbia
2016 disestablishments in Serbia